The canton of Beaugency is an administrative division of the Loiret department, central France. Its borders were modified at the French canton reorganisation which came into effect in March 2015. Its seat is in Beaugency.

It consists of the following communes:
 
Baccon
Baule
Beaugency
Cléry-Saint-André
Cravant
Dry
Jouy-le-Potier
Lailly-en-Val
Mareau-aux-Prés
Messas
Mézières-lez-Cléry
Tavers
Villorceau

References

Cantons of Loiret